Mordellistena mentiens is a species of beetle in the genus Mordellistena of the family Mordellidae. It was discovered in 1953.

References

mentiens
Beetles described in 1854